Fort Apache, The Bronx is a 1981 American crime drama film directed by Daniel Petrie. The film is about a hard-drinking, lonely veteran cop, Murphy  (Paul Newman), and his young partner Corelli (Ken Wahl), who work in a crime-ridden precinct in the Bronx. Although Murphy's life takes a good turn when he falls in love with Isabella (Rachel Ticotin), a young nurse, the arrival of a new, law-and-order-minded police captain commanding the precinct, Connoly (Ed Asner) threatens to tip the neighborhood's delicate balance into anarchy. Danny Aiello, Kathleen Beller, and Pam Grier play supporting roles. It was written by Heywood Gould and produced by Martin Richards and Thomas Fiorello, with David Susskind as executive producer.

It was filmed on location in the Bronx. Author Tom Walker sued Time-Life Television, alleging that the film infringed on his book Fort Apache, but lost after a lengthy court battle.  The film received mixed reviews; however, Newman's acting was noted as a strength of the film.  In addition, the film was the main inspiration for the long running police drama series Hill Street Blues.

Plot summary
°Police officers face many challenges in the decaying, impoverished, high-crime South Bronx region of New York City. Among these officers are NYPD officers Murphy (Paul Newman) and Corelli (Ken Wahl), who work out of the 41st Precinct, nicknamed "Fort Apache" because to those who work there, it feels like an army outpost in foreign territory. The streets are full of dangerous criminals such as violent gangs and drug dealers. Unemployment is at an all time high and the neighborhood is full of garbage and wrecked buildings. While Murphy is a hard-drinking and lonely divorced father, he has a great camaraderie with Corelli. Murphy's life also improves when he meets a young nurse, Isabella (Rachel Ticotin), as they start a romantic relationship.

The precinct is one of the worst and most dilapidated in the entire department, approaching demolition and staffed mostly by officers who are unwanted by, and have been transferred out of, other precincts. Additionally, the precinct's officers do not represent the large Puerto Rican community, as only 4% of the officers are Hispanic in the largest non-English speaking section of the Bronx. Corelli and Murphy attempt to maintain law and order by catching pimps and robbers, but they have conflicts with corrupt fellow officers, and a newly appointed police captain, Connolly (Ed Asner). There is rioting due to alleged police brutality, as well as issues related to the deaths of two rookie cops, who were shot by drug addicted Charlotte (Pam Grier) at the film's beginning. During the riot, Murphy and Corelli witness two officers beating up a teenager who was watching the events from a roof with his girlfriend, and they watch in horror as one of the cops angrily picks up the kid and throws him to his death on the street below. As Murphy becomes more intimate with Isabella, they begin a sexual relationship. While she is sleeping, Murphy notices "track marks" on her skin. She later admits that she uses heroin as a way to relax from working in such a stressful environment. She tells him that other hospital employees also use heroin, even the doctors. Murphy and Corelli are also being emotionally destroyed with the knowledge that they cannot turn in the murderous cops they witnessed earlier, as Corelli says he simply will not destroy his career to go against fellow cops and Murphy laments that he does not have the guts to smash through the "Blue Wall" and turn the evil cops in for their vile actions.

Illustrating the futility of policing in the precinct, Charlotte, the killer of the two rookie cops, is never found, despite mass arrests and interrogations. She is later killed by a dealer she tried to kill and her body is shown as an anonymous bundle dumped in roadside trash. In turn, Charlotte's killers are shot in a shootout with Murphy when they take hostages in the hospital Isabella worked at. Murphy is heartbroken when Isabella dies from a drug overdose and wrestles with the moral question of whether he should maintain the "blue code" and not inform authorities about the officer who threw the teen off the roof. Murphy ultimately decides to resign and report the killing, a decision that will make other officers hate him and view him as a "stool pigeon". Murphy seems to be on the verge of quitting the force, when he sees the purse snatcher fleeing from a house he burglarized. Murphy and Corelli chase the robber, and the image freezes as Murphy leaps to tackle him.

Cast
 Paul Newman as John Joseph Vincent Murphy III
 Ed Asner as Dennis Connolly
 Ken Wahl as Andrew Corelli
 Danny Aiello as Morgan
 Rachel Ticotin as Isabella
 Pam Grier as Charlotte
 Kathleen Beller as Theresa
 Tito Goya as Jumper / Detective
 Miguel Piñero as Hernando
 Jaime Tirelli as Jose
 Clifford David as Dacey
 Sully Boyar as Dugan
 Dominic Chianese as Corelli's Father
 Michael Higgins as Heffernan
 Paul Gleason as Detective
 Randy Jurgensen as Cop at Bar
 Gilbert Lewis as Mob Leader
 Cleavant Derricks as Suspect #4
 Reynaldo Medina as Detective
 Norman Matlock as Lincoln

Reception
The film opened at number one at the US box office with an opening weekend gross of $4,565,000 from 795 theatres. After 12 days in 860 theatres, it had grossed $11,266,000. The film went on to gross over $65 million worldwide at its time of release in 1981.  On release, reviews were mixed.  On Rotten Tomatoes, which collects both modern and contemporaneous review, the film has an 86% approval rating based on 14 reviews; the average rating is 6.6/10.

Richard Schickel, in Time, called it "more like a made-for-TV movie". He also added, "The film is not quite up to its star" and is "somewhere between Barney Miller and the works of Joseph Wambaugh".  Of the acting, he wrote, "But mainly it is Newman, now 56, who gives Fort Apache its modest distinction". Roger Ebert of the  Chicago Sun Times, called it "the most complete collection of cop-movie clichés since John Wayne played a Chicago cop in McQ". He criticized the number of unnecessary scenes and "story threads that lead nowhere". Ebert said about Newman that he is "good in his role", but called the film more of a TV show. Variety labeled the film "a very patchy picture, strong on dialog and acting and exceedingly weak on story", and criticizes it for its lack of depth. Nick Sambides Jr. at Allmovie calls it a "flinty but otherwise forgettable character study". Newman called the New York Post "a garbage can" after it published a photo of him on the set with a caption indicating that it portrayed a film crewperson "ward[ing] off a group of Hispanic youths protesting the film", which Newman claimed actually portrayed the crewmember warding off photographers. Because of the dispute, the Post banned him from its pages, even removing his name from films in the TV listings.

Legal issues
Local community groups threatened to file suit against the producers because of the way it depicted their neighborhood in the Bronx and for the depiction of ethnic minorities (Blacks and Hispanics). Because of this pressure, some changes were made to the script and a note was added to the title card at the beginning of the film.

In 1976, Tom Walker, a police officer who had been stationed at the 41st precinct, published Fort Apache (New York: Crowell, 1976. ), a non-fiction book about his experiences there. After the release of the film, Walker filed a lawsuit against its producers and writers alleging copyright infringement. Among other things, Walker argued that: "both the book and the film begin with the murder of a black and a white policeman with a handgun at close range; both depict cockfights, drunks, stripped cars, prostitutes and rats; both feature as central characters third- or fourth-generation Irish policemen who live in Queens and frequently drink; both show disgruntled, demoralized police officers and unsuccessful foot chases of fleeing criminals".

Walker lost in federal district court, and again on appeal. The appeals court ruled that these are stereotypical ideas, so called "scènes à faire" (French for "scenes that must be done"), and that copyright law does not protect concepts or ideas. The court ruling stated: "the book Fort Apache and the film Fort Apache: The Bronx were not substantially similar beyond [the] level of generalized or otherwise nonprotectible ideas, and thus [the] latter did not infringe copyright of [the] former".

Newman also filed a claim against Time-Life claiming that they had undersold the TV rights (on which he was due 15%) by selling to HBO for $1.5 million and not offering it to others and also understated foreign distribution receipts by over $3.75 million on which he was due 12.5%. An agreement was settled out of court.

See also
 List of American films of 1981
 Fort Apache
 Fort Apache (film)

References

External links
 
 
 
 

1981 films
1981 crime drama films
American crime drama films
American docudrama films
Fictional portrayals of the New York City Police Department
Films about the New York City Police Department
Films directed by Daniel Petrie
20th Century Fox films
Films set in the Bronx
Cockfighting in film
1980s English-language films
1980s American films